Jan Ornoch (born 30 May 1952 in Kuzawka) is a retired male race walker from Poland. He is the younger brother of Eugeniusz Ornoch and uncle of Mariusz Ornoch.

Achievements

References

1952 births
Living people
Polish male racewalkers
Athletes (track and field) at the 1972 Summer Olympics
Athletes (track and field) at the 1976 Summer Olympics
Olympic athletes of Poland
People from Włodawa County
European Athletics Championships medalists
Sportspeople from Lublin Voivodeship